Beautiful Tragedy is the debut studio album by American rock band In This Moment. The album was promoted largely in part by an interview conducted on Sirius Satellite Radio's Hard Attack station, which performed several songs off Beautiful Tragedy and helped expose the band to the heavy metal scene.

The band's substantially heavy sound has allowed songs like the single "Prayers" and "Daddy's Falling Angel" frequent airplay on Hard Attack. However, with its strong employment of clean vocals, the title track, "Beautiful Tragedy", has also seen airplay on the Sirius hard rock station, Octane.

Composition
The album has been described as metalcore, hard rock, melodic metalcore, and post-hardcore.

Release and promotion
A music video was produced for "Prayers", which had the band performing in an ancient chapel. As described in the Hard Attack interview, during the video shoot, vocalist Maria Brink violently met face-first with a camera as it was closing in on the group. After having her nose laceration superglued and made up, Brink finished singing, often keeping her hair in her face to prevent noticeability of her nose. Upon release, the video for "Prayers" aired on Headbangers Ball.

The second commercial release was for the title track, "Beautiful Tragedy", which was also accompanied by a music video. Brink says of the song, "I kept thinking of these funerals where there are family members who haven't talked to each other for years. And then, when they lose someone, suddenly everyone loves each other. Sometimes, something dark brings out something beautiful." The single broke into the Top 40 Active Rock charts.

The success of the album led to a year of touring the US, Europe, and Japan with acts such as Within Temptation, Walls of Jericho, and Lacuna Coil. The band also scored opening slots for Megadeth, Ozzy Osbourne and Rob Zombie at the end of 2007 which increased their profile in the metal scene.

An unreleased track from the Beautiful Tragedy sessions called "Surrender" was released to online digital retailers in December 2007.

Critical reception

The album received generally positive reviews upon release. Eduardo Rivadavia from AllMusic stated "True, with the exception of Brink's anomalous female presence, In This Moment tenders nothing truly original to the state of early-2000s metal on Beautiful Tragedy; but in a genre too often marred by the misuse of volume and aggression over substance, sometimes great songs should be cause enough for celebration."

Track listing

Personnel

In This Moment
 Maria Brink – vocals
 Chris Howorth – guitar
 Jesse Landry – bass guitar
 Blake Bunzel – guitar
 Jeff Fabb – drums

Additional personnel
 Recorded at Trax East Studio, New Brunswick, NJ
 Pre-production demos recorded at NRG
 Mastered at West West Side Music, New Windsor, NY
 Producer – Eric Rachel, In This Moment
 Pre-producer – Josh Newell, Preston Boebel
 Mastered by Alan Douches
 Engineer – Eric Kvortek, Eric Rachel
 Assistant engineer – Kyle Neeley
 Orchestra arranged by Michael Romeo
 Photography – Dean Karr, Olle Carlsson
 Artwork – Anthony Clarkson
 A&R – Phil Hinkle
 Management – Mercenary Management

Charts

References

2007 debut albums
In This Moment albums
Century Media Records albums